Gladys is an unincorporated community in Campbell County, Virginia, United States. Gladys has a post office with ZIP code 24554, which opened on April 4, 1836.

Shady Grove was listed on the National Register of Historic Places in 1982.

Notable people
Kevin Scott, Chief Technology Officer of Microsoft
Charles Haley, Five-time Super Bowl Champion and member of both the NFL Hall of Fame and the College Football Hall of Fame
Anthony Clark (actor), actor and stand up comedian.

References

Unincorporated communities in Campbell County, Virginia
Unincorporated communities in Virginia